Fernando Verdasco was the defending champion, but Milos Raonic defeated him in the final 7–6(7–6), 7–6(7–5).

Seeds

Qualifying

Draw

Finals

Top half

Bottom half

External links
 Main draw
 Qualifying draw

SAP Open - Singles
Singles 2011
2011 SAP Open